California Coast University (CCU) is a private for-profit online university based in Santa Ana, California. It is accredited by the Distance Education Accrediting Commission and approved by the State of California. Approximately 8,000 students are enrolled at any given time.

History

California Coast University was founded in 1973 as California Western University, with administration and library facilities located in downtown Santa Ana, California. The name was changed to California Coast University in 1981. In 2010, CCU moved to larger headquarters to accommodate its continued growth.

Academics
California Coast University presently offers undergraduate and graduate programs in business administration, management, marketing, psychology, criminal justice, human resource management, health care management, and education.  Academics at California Coast University are offered through five schools: School of Administration and Management, School of Arts and Sciences, School of Behavioral Science, School of Criminal Justice, and School of Education.

Accreditation
CCU was initially accredited by the Distance Education Accrediting Commission (DEAC) on January 8, 2005. DEAC accreditation recognizes the validity of CCU degrees up to doctoral level.

CCU has been approved to operate by the State of California since 1974. Approval to operate is presently granted by the California Bureau for Private Postsecondary Education (BPPE), a unit of the California Department of Consumer Affairs. The BPPE approves private postsecondary schools to operate in the state that meet "minimum standards established by the Bureau for integrity, financial stability, and educational quality."

In 2004, and prior to their DEAC accreditation, the U.S. General Accounting Office (GAO) found that federal employees had improperly received subsidies to attend CCU. The report also found that federal agencies may have incorrectly accepted CCU degrees issued before their accreditation.

Format and delivery
Since the early 1970s, California Coast University has offered off-campus self-paced degree programs to mid-career adults. Students were accepted who had verifiable years of full-time employment in the major field or a closely related field. In the 1980s, seven years of verifiable full time on the job experience were required before entering the doctoral programs. Five years of experience were required to enter the master's degree (MS) programs, and three years of experience were required to enter the baccalaureate (BS) programs. Academic approval by California required not less than nine months or one academic year to complete any degree program (a minimum of three years for the doctoral degrees). Students earn their degrees through a variety of methods including transfer credit from other recognized educational institutions, courses completed at CCU, and specialized, documented, formal training (undergraduate level only). In addition, doctoral students must complete a dissertation focused on research related to the field of education and an oral defense before their dissertation committee.

CCU's academic programs are designed based on research in the field of on-line/distance education, and in support of the University's mission to "...offer quality, affordable, flexible, online undergraduate and graduate educational programs that are valuable both personally and professional to our students." Students enroll and complete degrees for a variety of reasons including enhancing job performance, promotional purposes, salary increases, personal goals, etc. Students utilize library and research facilities in their own geographic areas, or on-line resources provided by CCU. Faculty members are hired based on a combination of educational achievement and as recognized leaders in their respective fields. Curriculum is based on current research and theory in the various fields, and developed by faculty members in conjunction with the curriculum development team.

Originally, California Coast University provided distance education degrees, at the bachelor’s, master’s and doctoral level, for a variety of majors including business administration, management, psychology, education, and engineering management. Over time, the engineering management programs, along with the other doctoral programs, were phased out in response to a reorientation of the CCU programs in preparation for accreditation by DETC (now DEAC). Students completing programs that were discontinued could complete their degrees in a teach-out agreement with the accreditor. Teach-out agreements are a standard practice required of all recognized educational institutions. During the teach-out phase, qualified faculty continue to work with enrolled students.

Since accreditation, CCU has continued to expand and to offer more distance education programs in the areas of health care administration and management, criminal justice, human resource management, marketing, general studies, and to offer additional master’s and professional doctoral degrees in education, since DEAC became authorized by US Department Of Education to accredit professional doctorates.

Notable alumni
 Mohammad Hossein Adeli, a diplomat, economist and academic who is presently Secretary General of Gas Exporting Countries Forum.
 David Borja, Northern Mariana Islands educator, military veteran, and politician. He was the running mate of gubernatorial candidate Ramon Guerrero in the 2009 gubernatorial election.
 Ben Bova, American author of more than 120 works of science fact and fiction, and six-time winner of the Hugo Award.
 Joseph V. Cuffari, Inspector General of the Department of Homeland Security.
 Jeff Papows, former CEO of Lotus Software Corporation
 Walter Martin an American Evangelical Christian minister founder the Christian Research Institute.
 Cheryl Saban, philanthropist, advocate for women, Senior Advisor, U.S. Mission to the United Nations, and Representative of the United States to the Sixty-seventh Session of the United Nations General Assembly.
 Tim Solobay, Pennsylvania politician who serves as the Fire Commissioner of Pennsylvania. He previously served as a member of the Pennsylvania State Senate and, before that, the Pennsylvania House of Representatives.
 Cynthia Denzler, Colombian-American-Swiss alpine skier who competed in the 2010 Winter Olympics. 
 Jeffrey Goodman, American archaeologist with training in geology and archaeology who also holds degrees from Columbia University, University of Arizona, and the Colorado School of Mines.
 Philip Wong Yu-hong, a member of the legislative council, a deputy to the National People's Congress, and vice-chairman of the Chinese General Chamber of Commerce in Hong Kong.

References

External links
 

 
Universities and colleges in Orange County, California
Private universities and colleges in California
Distance Education Accreditation Commission
Educational institutions established in 1973
1973 establishments in California